This list of oceanographers is presented in English alphabetical transliteration order (by surnames).

A

Carin Ashjian (US, born 1960)
James Percy Ault (US, 1881-1929)
Alice Alldredge (US, born 1949)
Lihini Aluwihare
Henryk Arctowski (Poland, 1871-1958)
Giuseppina Aliverti (Italy, 1894-1982)
Mark R. Abbott (US)
Shahid Ashraf (Pakistani, born 1947)
E. Virginia Armbrust (US)
Susan Avery (US, born 1950)
Susana Agustí (Spain)

B

Wladimir Besnard (France, 1890-1960)
Anton Frederik Bruun (1901-1961)
Karin Bryan (New Zealand)
Karl Banse (US)
Henry Bryant Bigelow (US, 1879-1967)
Thomas A. Budd (US, 1818-1862)
Robert Beardsley (US, born 1942)
María Teresa López Boegeholz (Chile, 1927-2006)
John Russell Bartlett (US, 1843-1904)
Paula Bontempi (US)
Robert Ballard (US, born 1942)
Nils Bang (South Africa, 1941-1977)
Deborah Bronk (US)
Wolfgang H. Berger (US/Germany, 1937-2017)
Ken Buesseler (US, born 1959)
Kirk Bryan (US, born 1929)
Charles-François Beautemps-Beaupré (France, 1766-1854)
Claudia Benitez-Nelson (US)
Brian B. Brown (US, born 1964)
Helen Bostock (Australia, born 1977)
Richard E. Byrd (US, 1888-1957)
Jacques Bourcart (France, 1891-1965)
Willard Bascom (US, 1916-2000)
Katherine Barbeau
S. Suresh Babu (India, born 1976)
Silas Bent (US, 1820-1887)
Alexander Buchan (Scotland, 1829-1907)
Ramón Bravo (1925-1998)
Amy Bower (US)
Lisa Beal (US)
Wallace Smith Broecker (US, 1931-2019)
Matilene Berryman (US, 1920-2003)
Harry Bryden (US, born 1946)
Heinrich Georg von Boguslawski (Germany, 1827-1884)
Thomas S. Bianchi (US, born 1956)
William Speirs Bruce (Scotland, 1867-1921)
Leonid Brekhovskikh (Russia/Soviet Union, 1917-2005)

C

Maria Bianca Cita (Italy, born 1924)
Craig A. Carlson (US, born 1963)
Katherine Richardson Christensen (born 1954)
James Churgin (US, born 1928)
Josefina Castellví (Spain, born 1935)
Eddy Carmack (Canada, born 1943)
Elizabeth Canuel
Anela Choy (US)
Rafael Antonio Curra
Kathleen Crane (US, born 1951)
Mike Coffin (US, born 1955)
Roger Charlier (1921-2018)
Zanna Chase (Australia)
Sallie W. Chisholm (US, born 1947)
Anita Conti (France, 1899-1997)
Fabien Cousteau (France, born 1967)
Ronald Ian Currie (Scotland, 1928-1996)
Anny Cazenave (France, born 1944)
Maureen Conte
Charles Shipley Cox (US, 1922-2015)
Jacques Cousteau (France, 1910-1997)
Robert Corell (US, born 1934)
Townsend Cromwell (US, 1922-1958)
Rosalind Coggon
William Curry (US)
David Edgar Cartwright (Britain, 1926-2015)
Philippe Cousteau (France, 1940-1979)
David Cromwell (Scotland, born 1962)
Claudia Cenedese (born 1971)
Jeff Chanton (US)
John A. Church (Australia, born 1951)

D

Ellen R.M. Druffel (US, born 1953)
Sonya Dyhrman (US, born 1972)
Shankar Doraiswamy (India, born 1964)
Robert S. Dietz (US, 1914-1995)
Tom Denniss (Australia, born 1961)
Bernard Delemotte (France)
Paul K. Dayton (US, born 1941)
Philippe Diolé (France, 1908-1977)
Albert Defant (Austria, 1884-1974)
Louis Dangeard (France, 1898-1987)
Arthur Thomas Doodson (Britain, 1890-1968)
Günter Dietrich (Germany, 1911-1972)
Karen Von Damm (US, 1955-2008)
Margaret Delaney
Scott Doney (US)
Jody Deming (US, born 1952)
Henry Newton Dickson (Scotland, 1866-1922)

E

John Englander (US)
Curtis Ebbesmeyer (US, born 1943)
Vagn Walfrid Ekman (Sweden, 1874-1954)
Kenneth O. Emery (US, 1914-1998)
Matthew England (Australia, born 1966)
John M. Edmond (Scotland, 1943-2001)
Marta Estrada (Spain, born 1946)
Ernst Ehrenbaum (Germany, 1861-1942)
Jean-Louis Étienne (France, born 1946)
Arthur Earland (Britain, 1866-1958)
Sylvia Earle (US, born 1935)

F

Kelly Falkner (US, born 1960)
Philip Froelich (US)
Richard Feely (US)
Evan Forde (US, born 1952)
Michael Fasham (Britain, 1942-2008)
Ernst Føyn (Norway, 1904-1984)
Gene Carl Feldman (US)
Louis Fortier (Canada, 1953-2020)
Arne Foldvik (Norway, born 1930)
Rana Fine (US, born 1944)
Sarah Fawcett (South Africa)
Lucyna Mirosława Falkowska (Poland, 1951-2021)
Jonas Fjeldstad (Norway, 1894-1985)
Marie Poland Fish (US, 1900-1989)
Léopold de Folin (France, 1817-1896)
Michael Freilich (US, 1954-2020)
Michèle Marie Fieux (France, born 1940)

G

Yakov Gakkel (Russia, 1901-1965)
Ken George (Britain, born 1947)
David McNiven Garner (1928-2016)
Kristina Gjerde
Jean-Pierre Gattuso (France, born 1958)
Timothy Gallaudet (US, born 1967)
Janet Grieve
Shari Gallop (New Zealand)
Adrian Gill (Australia, 1937-1986)
María de los Ángeles Alvariño González (Spain, 1916-2005)
Kirstyn Goodger (New Zealand, born 1991)
Alexander Gorodnitsky (Soviet Union, born 1933)
Ann Gargett (Canada)
Robert Gagosian (US, born 1944)
Christopher German (US)
Roman Glazman (US, 1948-2006)
David Gruber (US)
Helga Gomes (India)
Hamed Gohar (1907-1992)
Robert R. L. Guillard (US, 1921-2016)
Christopher Garrett (Britain, born 1943)
Sulochana Gadgil (India, born 1944)
J. Frederick Grassle (US, 1939-2018)
Sarah Gille
Joaquim Goes (India)

H

Karen Heywood (Britain)
Hava Hornung (1929-2012)
Bjørn Helland-Hansen (Norway, 1877-1957)
Bruce C. Heezen (US, 1924-1977)
Tessa M. Hill (US)
David Ho (US)
Gotthilf Hempel (Germany, born 1929)
Arlo Hemphill (US, born 1971)
Nicholas H. Heck (US, 1882-1953)
William Abbott Herdman (Scotland, 1858-1924)
Timothy D. Herbert (US)
Sara Harris (Canada, born 1969)
Peter M. Haugan (Norway, born 1958)
Julie Huber (US)
Archibald Gowanlock Huntsman (Canada, 1883-1973)
Kenneth Hsu (China, born 1929)
Karl Helfrich (US)
Klaus Hasselmann (Germany, born 1931)
John Hunt (US, 1918-2005)
Roberta Hamme (Canada)
Barbara Hickey (Canada)
Johan Hjort (Norway, 1869-1948)
Hilairy Hartnett
Ron Heath (New Zealand, born 1944)
Susan Humphris (Britain)
Eileen Hofmann

I

Anitra Ingalls (US)
Shizuo Ishiguro (Japan, 1920-2007)
Ian Irvine (Australia, born 1950)
Douglas Inman (US, 1920-2016)
Walter C. Pitman III (US, 1931-2019)
John Dove Isaacs (US, 1913-1980)

J

Samantha Joye (US, born 1965)
Nils Jerlov (Sweden, 1909-1990)
Ashanti Johnson (US)
Richard W. Johnson (US, 1929-2016)
W. W. Behrens Jr. (US, 1922-1986)
Catherine Jeandel (France, born 1957)
Stacy Jupiter (US, born 1975)
August von Jilek (Austria, 1819-1898)
Martin W. Johnson (US, 1893-1984)
James Johnstone (Scotland, 1870-1932)

K

Ellen S. Kappel (US)
Charles David Keeling (US, 1928-2005)
Otto Krümmel (Germany, 1854-1912)
Björn Kjerfve (Sweden, born 1944)
Alexander Kuchin (Russia, born 1888)
Deborah Kelley (US, born 1958)
Thor Kvinge (Norway, born 1929)
Nikolai Knipovich (Soviet Union, 1862-1939)
Miriam Kastner (US, born 1935)
Emily Klein
Elizabeth Kujawinski (US)
Brenda Konar (US)
Stanislav Kurilov (Canada/Russia, 1936-1998)
John A. Knauss (US, 1925-2015)
David Karl (US, born 1950)

L

Sonya Legg
Margaret Leinen (US, born 1946)
Eugenie Lisitzin (1905-1989)
Lisa Levin (US)
Evelyn Lessard (US)
Karin Lochte (Germany, born 1952)
Mojib Latif (Germany/Pakistani, born 1954)
Lucien Laubier (France, 1936-2008)
Louis Legendre (Canada, born 1945)
Alan Longhurst (Canada/Britain, born 1925)
Susan Lozier (US)
Cindy Lee (US)
Jean Lynch-Stieglitz
Kelsey Leonard
William Li (Canada, born 1952)
Johann Lutjeharms (South Africa, 1944-2011)
Anthony Seymour Laughton (Britain, 1927-2019)
Richard A. Lutz (US, born 1949)
Rob Lewis (Australia)
Bruce P. Luyendyk (US, born 1943)
Cornelia Lüdecke (Germany, born 1954)

M

Catalina Martinez (US)
Albert I, Prince of Monaco (1848-1922)
John Martin (US, 1935-1993)
K. Megan McArthur (US, born 1971)
Nancy Marcus (US, 1950-2018)
Kate Moran
Timothy McGee (US, born 1955)
Sheina Marshall (Britain, 1896-1977)
Martin Mork (Norway, 1933-2017)
Silvia Maciá (US, born 1972)
George Murray (Scotland, 1858-1911)
Tad Murty (Canada/India, born 1938)
Alfred Merz (Austria, 1880-1925)
José Hipólito Monteiro
Anita McConnell (Britain, 1936-2016)
Jennifer Mackinnon (US, born 1973)
Håkon Mosby (Norway, 1903-1989)
John Marshall (Britain)
Harry A. Marmer (US, 1885-1953)
Ian MacDonald (US)
Roberta Marinelli (US)
Carrie Manfrino (US)
Fiona McLaughlin (Canada)
Ron G. Mason (Britain, 1916-2009)
Margaret Mulholland
Benjamin Van Mooy (US)
Ramon Margalef (Spain, 1919-2004)
Jacqueline McGlade (Britain, born 1955)
Henry Mitchell (US, 1830-1902)
Charles J. Moore (US)
Kenneth C. Macdonald (US, born 1947)
Jean-Louis Michel (France, born 1945)
John Murray (Scotland, 1841-1914)
Henry William Menard (US, 1920-1986)
David Marshall (Britain, born 1968)
Walter Munk (US, 1917-2019)
Wiesław Masłowski (US/Poland)
David Mearns (US)
Katrin Meissner (Australia/Germany)
Jochem Marotzke (Germany, born 1959)
Jessica Meeuwig (Australia)
Homer A. McCrerey (US, 1919-1999)
Matthew Fontaine Maury (US, 1806-1873)
Susanne Menden-Deuer
Lorenz Magaard (US/Germany, 1934-2020)
Oleg Mamayev (Soviet Union, 1925-1994)
Marcia McNutt (US, born 1952)
Parker MacCready (US)
James C. McWilliams (US)
Cecilie Mauritzen (Norway, born 1961)
Nils-Axel Mörner (Sweden, born 1938)
Trevor McDougall (Australia, born 1952)
Jack Moyer (US, 1929-2004)
Larry Mayer (US)
Luigi Ferdinando Marsili (Italy, 1658-1730)
John E. McCosker (US)
Peter B. de Menocal (US)

N

Shailesh Nayak (India, born 1953)
Pearn P. Niiler (US, 1937-2010)
Doron Nof (US, born 1944)
Georg von Neumayer (Australia, 1826-1909)
John Elliott Nafe (US, 1914-1996)

O

Delia Oppo (US)
Mark Ohman (US)
James O'Brien (US, 1935-2016)
Andrew Picken Orr (Britain, 1875-1961)

P

Johann Siegmund Popowitsch (Austria, 1705-1774)
N. Kesava Panikkar (India, 1913-1977)
Carlos I of Portugal (1863-1908)
Prem Chand Pandey (India, born 1945)
Mary Jane Perry (US)
Owen Martin Phillips (US, 1930-2010)
Albert Eide Parr (US, 1900-1991)
Trevor Platt (Canada/Britain, 1942-2020)
June Pattullo (US, 1921-1972)
Joseph Pedlosky (US, born 1938)
Timothy R. Parsons (Canada, 1932-2022)
Lloyd Peck (Britain)
G. Michael Purdy (Britain)
Adina Paytan
Hans Pettersson (Sweden, 1888-1966)
Nadia Pinardi (Italy, born 1956)
Aditi Pant (India, born 1943)
Lawrence R. Pomeroy (US, 1925-2020)

Q

Jimena Quirós (Spain, 1899-1983)
Syed Zahoor Qasim (India, 1926-2015)
Detlef Quadfasel (Germany)

R

Douglas ReVelle (US, 1945-2010)
Christina Riesselman (US)
Alfred C. Redfield (US, 1890-1983)
Clare Reimers
Gordon Arthur Riley (US, 1911-1985)
Joellen Louise Russell (US, born 1970)
John Francis Ropek (US, 1917-2009)
Stefan Rahmstorf (Germany, born 1960)
Ana Ravelo (US)
Collin Roesler (US)
Vladimir Ryabinin (Russia, born 1956)
Peter A. Rona (US, 1934-2014)
Sonia Ribes-Beaudemoulin (France, born 1953)
Joseph L. Reid (US, 1923-2015)
Callum Roberts (Britain)
Moninya Roughan (Australia)
Carl-Gustaf Rossby (US, 1898-1957)
Dean Roemmich (US)
Jules Richard (France, 1863-1945)
Monika Rhein (Germany)
Roger Revelle (US, 1909-1991)
Rengaswamy Ramesh (India, born 1956)
Paola Malanotte Rizzoli

S

James Syvitski (US)
Phyllis Stabeno
Henry Stommel (US, 1920-1992)
Paul Scully-Power (Australia, born 1944)
Curtis A. Suttle (Canada)
Mary Sears (US, 1905-1997)
Deborah Steinberg (US)
Anatoly Sagalevich (Russia/Soviet Union, born 1938)
Gregory S. Stone (US, born 1957)
William Sager (US, born 1954)
Vasily Vladimirovich Shuleikin (Russia/Soviet Union, 1895-1979)
Rick Spinrad (US)
Harald Sverdrup (Norway, 1888-1957)
Caroline M. Solomon (US)
Johan Sandström (Sweden, 1874-1947)
Yuly Shokalsky (Russia/Soviet Union, 1856-1940)
F.G. Walton Smith (US, 1909-1989)
Heidi Sosik (US)
Wen Shengchang (China, 1921-2022)
Athelstan Spilhaus (US, 1911-1998)
Fred Spiess (US, 1919-2006)
Odd Henrik Sælen (Norway, 1920-2008)
Kathleen Stafford (US)
Gerold Siedler (Germany, born 1933)
Natacha Aguilar de Soto (Spain)
John Steele (Scotland, 1926-2013)
Janet Sprintall (US)
Frank E. Snodgrass (US, 1920-1985)
Vladimir Shtokman (Soviet Union, 1909-1968)
Charles Dwight Sigsbee (US, 1845-1923)
Katharine Jefferts Schori (US, born 1954)
Sybil P. Seitzinger (US)
Mary Wilcox Silver (US)
Pyotr Shirshov (Soviet Union, 1905-1953)

T

Stephen Thorpe (Britain)
David Titley (US, born 1958)
LuAnne Thompson (US)
Lynne Talley (US, born 1954)
Anitra Thorhaug (US)
Mary-Louise Timmermans
Robert Thunell (US, 1951-2018)
Marie Tharp (US, 1920-2006)
Marta Torres
Thomas Gordon Thompson (US, 1888-1961)
Robert K. Trench (US, born 1940)
Hendrik Tolman (Netherlands, born 1961)
David Thornalley (Britain, born 1982)
Zera Luther Tanner (US, 1835-1906)

U

Caroline C. Ummenhofer (Germany)

V

Victor Vacquier (US, 1907-2009)
Allyn Vine (US)
Gilbert L. Voss (US, 1918-1989)
P. N. Vinayachandran (India, born 1964)
Usha Varanasi (US)

W

Kenneth M. Watson (US, born 1921)
Jan Erik Weber (Norway, born 1944)
Andy Watson (Britain, born 1952)
Susan Wijffels (Australia, born 1965)
Karen Wishner (US)
Thomas Westbrook Waldron (US, 1814-1844)
Georg Wüst (Germany, 1890-1977)
Bess Ward
Lucy R. Wyatt (Britain)
Klaus Wyrtki (US, 1925-2013)
Angelicque White (US)
John Francon Williams (Britain, 1854-1911)
Don Walsh (US, born 1931)
Charles Wilkes (US, 1798-1877)
Josh Willis (US)
Dawn Wright (US, born 1961)
Patricia A. Wheeler (US, born 1949)
Warren White (US)
Carl Wunsch (US, born 1941)
Richard Russell Waldron (US, 1803-1846)
Anya Waite (Canada)
Anna Wåhlin (Sweden, born 1970)
Edith Widder (US, born 1951)
John Woods (Britain, born 1939)
Jonathan White (US)
Val Worthington (Britain, 1920-1995)
Philip Woodworth (Britain)
Vladimir Wiese (Russia/Soviet Union, 1886-1954)
Sydney Oskar Wigen (Canada, 1923-2000)
Rebecca Woodgate
Alexandra Worden (US, born 1970)

Y

Lisan Yu

Z

Nikolay Nikolaevich Zubov (Russia, 1885-1960)
Mira Zore-Armanda (1930-2012)

Oceanographers